Elena Kratter (born 5 July 1996) is a Swiss para-athlete who represented Switzerland at the 2020 Summer Paralympics, in Women's long jump T63, winning a bronze medal.

Career
Kratter competed at the 2019 World Para Alpine Skiing Championships and switched to para-athletics after sustaining a knee injury while skiing.

References

Living people
1996 births
Swiss female long jumpers
Swiss female sprinters
Sportspeople from St. Gallen (city)
Medalists at the World Para Athletics European Championships
Athletes (track and field) at the 2020 Summer Paralympics
Medalists at the 2020 Summer Paralympics
Paralympic bronze medalists for Switzerland
Paralympic medalists in athletics (track and field)
Paralympic athletes of Switzerland
20th-century Swiss women
21st-century Swiss women